The Cultural and Education Affairs Committee (French: Commission des Affaires culturelles et de l'Éducation) is one of the eight standing committees of the French National Assembly.

Chairmen 

 Bruno Studer - 15th legislature of the French Fifth Republic

Membership 
15th legislature of the French Fifth Republic

References 

Committees of the National Assembly (France)